This is a list of newspapers published in, or for, the South West region of Western Australia.

The South West is Western Australia's most popular regional tourist destination. The region also has a notable agriculture industry; crops such as grapes, apples and avocados, account for 60% of the regions agricultural commodities.

Just over half of the current newspapers distributed in the South West region are owned by Seven West Media.

Titles

See also 
 List of newspapers in Western Australia
 Gascoyne newspapers
 Goldfields-Esperance newspapers
 Great Southern newspapers
 Kimberley newspapers
 Mid West newspapers
 Pilbara newspapers
 Wheatbelt newspapers

References

External links 
 
 
 
 
 
 
 
 
 

Lists of newspapers published in Western Australia
Newspapers published in Western Australia by region
South West Newspapers